Weller is an unincorporated community in Buchanan County, Virginia, in the United States.

History
Weller was named for H. C. Weller, a railroad official.

References

Unincorporated communities in Buchanan County, Virginia
Unincorporated communities in Virginia